Japa is a spiritual discipline.

Japa may also refer to:
Japa (footballer, born 1986), Jonas Augusto Bouvie, Brazilian football forward
Japa (footballer, born 1990), Endheu Kléber Nesiyama, Brazilian football forward
Caio Japa  (born 1983), Brazilian futsal player
Erick Japa (born 1999),  Dominican football player
Theo Japa (born 1995), Japanese-Greek football player
Japa, nickname for Nigerian brain drain

JAPA may refer to:

JAPA, the Journal of the American Psychoanalytic Association
JAPA, the Journal of the American Planning Association

References